Bebearia cutteri, or Cutter's forester, is a moth in the family Nymphalidae. It is found in Sierra Leone, Liberia, Ivory Coast, Ghana, Nigeria, Cameroon, Gabon, the Republic of the Congo, the Central African Republic and the Democratic Republic of the Congo. The habitat consists of wet forests.

Subspecies
Bebearia cutteri cutteri (eastern Ivory Coast, Ghana, Nigeria)
Bebearia cutteri camiadei Hecq, 2002 (Central African Republic)
Bebearia cutteri cognata (Grünberg, 1910) (Cameroon, Gabon, Congo)
Bebearia cutteri cuypersi Hecq, 2002 (Democratic Republic of the Congo)
Bebearia cutteri harleyi (Fox, 1968) (Sierra Leone, Liberia)

References

Butterflies described in 1865
cutteri
Butterflies of Africa
Taxa named by William Chapman Hewitson